A Child Is Waiting is a 1963 American drama film written by Abby Mann based on his 1957 Westinghouse Studio One teleplay of the same name.  The film was produced by Stanley Kramer and directed by John Cassavetes. Burt Lancaster portrays the director of a state institution for children with intellectual disablilites or who were emotionally disturbed, and Judy Garland is a new teacher who challenges his methods.

Plot
Jean Hansen, a Juilliard graduate, joins the staff of the Crawthorne State Mental Hospital and immediately clashes with the director, Dr. Matthew Clark, about his strict training methods. She becomes emotionally involved with 12-year-old Reuben Widdicombe, and is certain his attitude will improve if he is reunited with the divorced parents who abandoned him. She sends for Mrs. Widdicombe, who agrees with the doctor's opinion that it would be best if Reuben doesn't see her, but as she leaves the grounds, her son sees her and chases her car. Distraught, he runs away from the school.

Dr. Clark finds him and brings him back the following morning, and Jean offers to resign. Clark asks her to stay and continue her rehearsals for the Thanksgiving pageant. On the day of the show, Reuben's father Ted arrives, having decided to enroll him in a private school. When he hears Reuben recite a poem and positively react to the audience's applause, he decides to leave him in the care of Jean, who is asked to welcome a new boy to the institution by Dr. Clark.

Cast

Production
Producer Stanley Kramer modeled the film's school on the Vineland Training School in New Jersey. He wanted to bring the plight of mentally and emotionally disturbed children to the movie-going public and try "to throw a spotlight on a dark-ages type of social thinking which has tried to relegate the subject of retardation to a place under the rocks." He wanted to cast Burt Lancaster because the actor had a troubled child of his own (his son Bill had polio that made one of his legs shorter than the other). Ingrid Bergman, Katharine Hepburn, and Elizabeth Taylor were considered for the role of Jean Hansen, which went to Judy Garland, who previously had worked with Lancaster and Kramer on the 1961 film Judgment at Nuremberg. She was experiencing personal problems at the time and the director felt a supportive work environment would help her get through them.

When original director Jack Clayton was forced to withdraw due to a scheduling problem, he was replaced by John Cassavetes, who was still under contract to Paramount Pictures, on the recommendation of screenwriter Abby Mann. Cassavetes was fond of improvisation and his approach to filmmaking clashed with those of Kramer and the leading players.

Most of the students in the film were portrayed by children with actual mental disabilities from Pacific State Hospital (later known as Lanterman Developmental Center) in Pomona, California. After the film's release, Kramer recalled, "They surprised us every day in reaction and what they did." Lancaster said, "We have to ad-lib around the periphery of a scene and I have to attune and adjust myself to the unexpected things they do. But they are much better than child actors for the parts. They have certain gestures that are characteristic, very difficult for even an experienced actor."

Problems arose between Kramer and Cassavetes during post-production. Editor Gene Fowler, Jr. recalled, "It was a fight of technique. Stanley is a more traditional picture-maker, and Cassavetes was, I guess, called Nouvelle Vague. He was trying some things, which frankly I disagreed with, and I thought he was hurting the picture by blunting the so-called message with technique." Cassavetes felt his personal feelings about the subject matter added to the disagreements between himself and Kramer, who eventually fired the director. In a later interview, Cassavetes said, 

Cassavetes disowned the film, although following its release he said, "I didn't think his film – and that's what I consider it to be, his film – was so bad, just a lot more sentimental than mine." Kramer observed, "My dream was to jump the barrier of ordinary objection to the subject matter into an area in which the treatment of it and the performance of it would be so exquisite that it would transcend all that. Somewhere we failed."

Reception

Box office
The film recorded a loss of $2 million.

Critical reception
In his review in The New York Times, Bosley Crowther said, 

Variety called the film "a poignant, provocative, revealing dramatization" and added, "Burt Lancaster delivers a firm, sincere, persuasive and unaffected performance as the professionally objective but understanding psychologist who heads the institution. Judy Garland gives a sympathetic portrayal of an overly involved teacher who comes to see the error of her obsession with the plight of one child."

Time Out London said, "Cassavetes elicits magnificent performances from his cast, making especially fine use of Garland's tremulous emotionalism, although the occasional drifts into didacticism [...] entail the sort of special pleading Cassavetes was keen to avoid. Flawed but fascinating."

Home media
A Child Is Waiting was released on Blu-ray and DVD by Kino Lorber Studio Classics in November 2015.

See also
 List of American films of 1963
 Mental institution
 Message picture

References

External links
 
 
 
 
 

1963 films
1963 drama films
American drama films
Films about psychiatry
Films based on television plays
American black-and-white films
Films scored by Ernest Gold
Films directed by John Cassavetes
United Artists films
Films produced by Stanley Kramer
1960s English-language films
1960s American films
Films about disability